Advance Democracy is a 1938 piece for unaccompanied choir by British composer Benjamin Britten.

History 
In 1938, in reaction to the Munich Agreement and threat posed by the Axis against the liberal order in Europe, the London Co-operative Society commissioned a propaganda piece to promote democracy. Poet Randall Swingler wrote the lyrics.

Music 
The piece begins with text evoking the fascist menace, with a minor key and staccato. The call to advance democracy is underlined by a bright C major.

References

References

External links 
 S:t Jacobs Ungdomskör - Benjamin Britten: Advance Democracy

Compositions by Benjamin Britten
1938 compositions